Leslie 'Les' Collins (born 24 May 1958) is a former speedway rider. He finished runner-up in the 1982 Speedway World Championship as well as winning the Intercontinental Final in 1982, the British Under-21 Championship in 1977 and the British League Riders' Championship in 1980.

Career

Crewe, Stoke & Belle Vue
Born  in Manchester, England, Collins started his career with the Crewe Kings before moving Belle Vue Aces. He was loaned to the Stoke Potters in 1976 but in 1977 he made a place with the Aces his own, riding alongside brother Peter and family friend Chris Morton.

Leicester Lions & 1982 World Individual Final
He moved to the Leicester Lions in 1980 where he stayed until 1983. It was the 1982 season however that proved to be the high point of his career. He qualified for his first and only Speedway World Championship final, winning the Inter Continental title on the way. He finished runner-up that day, despite being the only rider to beat the eventual and defending champion, home town (Los Angeles) hero Bruce Penhall. The final was held at Los Angeles Memorial Coliseum.

An incident involving Penhall and the late Kenny Carter in heat 14 saw Carter excluded. Both riders were being beaten by Peter Collins at the point of the crash. Despite protests by Carter it was he who was excluded rather than Penhall; If Penhall had been excluded then the title may have headed in Les's direction, although that's a strange conclusion to come to given Carter had more points than Penhall at that stage, and would have been favourite to win a re-run Heat 14. Older brother Peter had been comfortably leading the race when Carter fell. Penhall won the re-run from Peter Collins and Australia's Phil Crump.

Sheffield & Edinburgh
In 1984 Collins moved to the Sheffield Tigers, still in the top flight British League. In 1986 he dropped down to the National League and signed for the Edinburgh Monarchs, where he rode for ten seasons. In his first season with the Monarchs he became pairs champion with Doug Wyer. The Monarchs won the National League Four Team Tournament in 1993 with Collins in the team.

Cradley Heath, Stoke
1996 saw Collins riding in the top flight again, with the Cradley Heathens at Stoke followed by a year in the Premier League back with the Stoke Potters. Collins missed the whole of the 1998 season but in 1999 he returned to the sport with Edinburgh's rivals, the Glasgow Tigers.

Glasgow
It was at Glasgow in the 2001 and 2002 seasons he rode with his son Aidan. The 2002 team was unique as there was a second father and son connection. Former Leicester teammate Mark Courtney was also in the line-up with his son Scott.

He had a spell in 2002 with the Workington Comets but returned to Glasgow in 2003 where he was again ever present, as he was in 2000 and 2001.

Family
Collins has four brothers all of whom were speedway riders, 1976 World Champion Peter, Phil, Neil and Stephen. His son Aidan and nephew Chris were also riders but have both retired from the sport.

World Final Appearances

Individual World Championship
 1982 -  Los Angeles, Memorial Coliseum - 2nd - 13pts

Individual Under-21 World Championship
 1977* -  Vojens, Speedway Center - 3rd - 7pts
* Known as the European Under-21 Championship. Meeting declared after 12 heats due to rain.

World Longtrack

Finalist

 1983 Marianske Lazne 3pts (15th)
 1984   Herxheim 4pts (17th)

European Grasstrack Championship

Finalist

 1979   Assen 11pts (7th)
 1980   Bad Waldsee 15pts (5th)

References

External links
 Les Collins in the Leicester Lions Scrapbook
 Aidan Collins Website
 http://grasstrackgb.co.uk/les-collins/

Living people
1958 births
British speedway riders
English motorcycle racers
Sportspeople from Manchester
Belle Vue Aces riders
Workington Comets riders
Edinburgh Monarchs riders
Glasgow Tigers riders
Sheffield Tigers riders
Stoke Potters riders
Cradley Heathens riders
Leicester Lions riders
Crewe Kings riders
Individual Speedway Long Track World Championship riders